Mogadishu City Club is a professional football club based in Mogadishu, Somalia. They play at Mogadishu Stadium, it is one of the most successful football clubs in the country. The club plays with Elman FC in the Mogadishu Derby. Formerly known as Banadir Sports Club, in 2019, the club was renamed to Mogadishu City Club. In 2019, Mohamed Mistri Lamjed is named the new manager of Mogadishu City Club.

History

Early years (1963–1990)
Mogadishu City Club, abbreviated as MCC, is a Somalia multi-Sports club present in the Capital City of Somalia MCC, was Established in 1963-58 Years Ago, the Club which was nicknamed by Municipio Club, created by the highly motivated young sports players composed of boys and girls playing all types of Sports, by the Support of the Mayor of Mogadishu Capital City in 1963, The Mayor of Mogadishu Capital City Council in 1963 give a title that was named Mogadishu Club, The club consisted 9 of Sports teams: Football team, Basketball team, Handball team, Table tennis team, tennis team, Volleyball team, Swimming Team, Athletic team, Cycle team.

After Civil War (1991–2018)
Following the start of the civil war in early 1991, the stadium of Mogadishu Club was kept save and used by the Youth club known as Banaadir Sports Club which they have been established Group of youth who were neighborhoods of the Club Stadium & Club Camp, this title has been changed By Mogadishu City Club, abbreviated as MCC, which is going to present by Mogadishu Capital city of Somalia the Club name was re-established after 30 years by the Mayor of Mogadishu Capital City Mr. Abdurrahman Omar Osman Eng. Yariisow, by the Support of the neighborhoods where among the youth who kept the property of the club safe for 30 years.

Squad 2021–22

Coaching staff

Achievements
Somalia League: 10
2019–2020, 2015–16, 2013–14, 2009–10, 2008-09, 2004–06, 1999, 1989, 1986, 1976

Somalia Cup: 3
2003, 2012, 2020

References

Football clubs in Somalia
Sport in Mogadishu